The Cannon Branch Fort is a historic American Civil War fortification at 10611 Gateway Boulevard in Manassas, Virginia.  Details of the exact time and circumstances of its construction are not known; it is believed to have been built by Union Army forces in 1863 or 1864 to defend the nearby railroad lines.

The site was listed on the National Register of Historic Places in 1999.  It is now a city park.

References

External links
 City of Manassas.org: Cannon Branch Fort Park

Manassas, Virginia
Virginia municipal and county parks
Buildings and structures in Manassas, Virginia
Forts in Virginia
Military facilities on the National Register of Historic Places in Virginia
National Register of Historic Places in Manassas, Virginia
Tourist attractions in Manassas, Virginia